Energique is the second studio album by the English electronic music group Bizarre Inc, released on 1992. It features singles such as "Playing with Knives", "Plutonic", "I'm Gonna Get You", "Took My Love" and "Love in Motion".

Critical reception
Mandi James from NME said, "What Energique ultimately confirms is that Bizarre Inc are unsung heroes of a scene which has moved well and truly overground." Another editor, Ian McCann, complimented the album as "excellent", adding, "Here are the singles that filled floors and fields throughout 1991, plus a pile of newer tunes to match: 'Raise Me', X-Static', 'Playing with Knives', the mighty 'Plutonic' and current monster 'I'm Gonna Get You'. The quality is uniformly hight, the beats still rough despite the delay, and the vibes heavy. More than that you can't ask of a techno record." Sam Wood from Philadelphia Inquirer wrote, "Elegantly simple and simply elegant, Bizarre Inc might even move a stubborn late-boomer dance."

Track listing
 "Raise Me" (Ascension Mix)
 "X-Static" (Adult Mix)
 "Playing with Knives" (Quadrant Mix)
 "Plutonic"
 "Dangerous Women"
 "I'm Gonna Get You" (Original Flavour Mix) (featuring Angie Brown)
 "Love Will Save the Day" (featuring Cameron)
 "Took My Love" (featuring Angie Brown)
 "Love in Motion" (featuring Yvonne Yanney)
 "Agroovin'"
 "Delicious Minds"

Notes 

1993 albums
House music albums by English artists